The Rally de Erechim, or Rally Internacional de Erechim is an international rally racing event based in Erechim in the south state of Brazil, Rio Grande do Sul. The event is round of the Codasur South American Rally Championship; the Brazilian championship, the Brasileiro de Rally de Velocid and the Campeonato Gaúcho de Rally Velocidade.

The event was first run in 1998 and has been consistently a highlight of the Brazilian series. It was one of the foundation events of the Codasur South American Rally Championship, and apart from 2005 where it was briefly replaced by the Rally Bento Gonçalves, has been part of the championship since then. Paraguayan drivers Diego Dominguez and Gustavo Saba are the most successful drivers in the rallies history having each won four times.

List of winners
Sourced in part from:

References

External links
Official website
CODASUR official website
Brazilian championship Official website

Codasur South American Rally Championship
Rally competitions in Brazil